Kadokawa Gempak Starz  (角川平方) (trading as Gempak Starz, formerly Malaysian Art Square Group) is a Malaysian graphic novel, comics and manga publisher owned by Kadokawa Corporation. Originally established as Komik Lawak Atau Lawak Creation in 1971, the company previously produced Gempak, a magazine dedicated to showcasing local comic artists from Malaysia to wider audiences. Gempak has the distinction of being the first Malaysian info-comic magazine, offering news and articles about the ACG (Animation, Comics & Games) world in and outside of the country. Gempak magazine aims to encourage the local development of such industries, facilitating the global spread of Malaysian talent.

History
Komik-1 Debuted On Since Komik Lawak Atau Lawak Pubilsh On July 9 1971 But
1978 Pubilsh Gila Gila On 1980 Lawak Atau Lawak Of Part Line.

Gempak debuted on 1 June 1998, at a time when Malaysia was attempting to recover from the 1997 economic crisis. The economic crisis brought a hard impact on the Malaysian comic industry.

To gain a place in the Malaysian comic market, Art Square Creation incorporated the "info-comic" approach, which became the main formula of Gempaks success, and the new standard format for many Malaysian comics. It took 18 months for their success to take off without any help from other media advertisements. Starting as a monthly issue for the first three years, it has come to be published bi-monthly (since June 2001), with many demands that the magazine should go for weekly issue.

Their concept of an info-comic magazine has become a trend followed by many recent comic magazines, including one of Malaysia's biggest publishers, Karangkraf Sdn. Bhd., who began releasing a new info-comic magazine titled Jom (later ceased publication). The success of Gempak also resulted in the success of its publisher, Art Square Creation Sdn. Bhd., who expanded to become Art Square Group with three subsidiaries: Art Square Creation Sdn. Bhd, Anjung Taipan Sdn. Bhd., and Gala Unggul Sdn. Bhd. All Art Square Group products are now labelled under their own brand "GEMPAK STARZ."

Gempak, under Art Square Creation, won the Persatuan Penerbit-Penerbit Majalah Malaysia (MPA) award under other category special Malay magazine ("majalah pengkhususan" (Bahasa Malaysia)) 2007.

In December 2015, Kadokawa Corporation through its Hong Kong subsidiary Kadokawa Holdings Asia Ltd (KHA), acquired an 80% stake in Malaysian Art Square Group (MSG).

Kadokawa Gempak Starz era
Following Kadokawa Corporation's acquisition, MSG was renamed to Kadokawa Gempak Starz in January 2016.

Subsidiaries
SPARKS: An online store.
Gempak Starz store: An online store.
KADOKAWA GEMPAK STARZ SDN BHD: Malaysia division.
KADOKAWA GEMPAK STARZ (S) PTE LTD: Singapore division.

Gempak Starz products
Besides magazines, Art Square Group publishes more than 200 products under the brand of GEMPAK STARZ. The products include graphic novels (including acquired foreign comics), T-shirts, caps, mugs, toys, posters, illustration books, stationery, and collection items.

Publishing labels
Gempak Starz:
Learn More (活學堂): Educational comic series.
Magic Bean (魔豆): Pop literature series.
Gempack 360°/CK 360°/Learn More 360°: Publisher's YouTube channels, features various comics and ACG-related content, including artist interviews and more.

Komik Seram
Komik Seram (lit. Horror Comic) is the name for their horror comics. They are most popular and best-selling in the company, although, minimum comics are sometimes sold out because of popularity.

Below is the list of horror comics sold by Gempak:
Dari Alam Angker (by various artists)
Warisan Puaka by Nizam Bachok
Seringai Malam by Nizam Bachok
Dajal Berbisik by KF
Lawang Penamat by Maita Nao

List of Gempak comics Cartoonist
Keith
 Lawak Kampus 
 Lawak Kampus Connection
 Lawak Kampus Friends Edition
 Lawak Kampus League
 Lawak Kampus Move On
 Lawak Kampus Rebound
 Encore! Lawak Kampus Artbook
 Kuso High School 
 Kuso High School Log In
 Kuso High School Teamwork
 Wasabi

Zint
 2 Dudes
 Bodyguard.com
 Boy's Scout
 GoGo Chacha Street
 Hero
 K.O King Conquest
 Kaleidoscoope Collection 01: Our Blue Sky
 Kaleidoscoope Collection 03: The Journey
 Kaleidoscoope Collection 04: Great Day
 Kaleidoscoope Collection 05: Woo Hoo!
 Kisah Pengembaraan Kroit
 Kijiya  1 - 15
 Lawak Under 18
 MFEO (Meant For Each Other)
 Raiden
 Scarbot & Monky
 Sharkman the Hitman
 Si Penjual Aiskrim
 Under 18: Elite
 User
 Xpresi Tempur

Kaoru
 Kaoru's Cake House
 143 Kaoru's Cake House (Novel)
 Daisuki
 143
 Colours
 Meet Cupid
 After School With You
 Candy Series
 Cinta Untuk Dijual
 Cuma Kucing Yang Tahu
 Helios Eclipse oleh Kaoru
 Lawak Valentine
 LOVE DRAMA
 Love For Sale
 Love Triangle
 Lost Diary
 Maid Maiden – Monday
 Maid Maiden – Wednesday
 Maid Maiden – Friday
 Maid Maiden – Saturday
 Maid Maiden – Sunday
 My Secret Bodyguard
 My Secret Boyfriend
 My Secret Buddy
 Nonetheless, I love You
 Only The Cats Know
 Strawberry Vampire
 Tell Me Your Name (New)
 Voice of An Angel

 Ben
 Fatal Chaos Turbo Ex
 Fatal Chaos
 Te@mare
 Le Gardenie
 Naive
 The Fishes
 Innocent

 Juice/Norman Noh
 Juice
 Caramel Theater
 Primavera

 Slaium
 Utopia High
 Utopia High Revisited
 Utopia High Revisited- Hunting High & Low
 Lawak Utopia High Reunion
 Drak

 Fakhrul Anour
 Cinta Tunggal (Novel)
 143 Kaoru's Cake House (Novel)
 Pentas Realiti: Aspirasi Seni (Novel)
 Siri Maskeret Cinta: Hanya...
 Hanya...Cinta
 Mencintai Dia

 Tadatada / Lee Kok Chen
 Good Morning Teacher!
 Hello Mei Mei
 Jejak Libasan Jaguh
 Monster Girl
 Paper Labyrinth
 Selamat Pagi Cikgu!
 The Prince and I
X-VENTURE: The Golden Age Of Adventure

 Daniyal Aiman
 Komik Fatdream 
 Demam Cinta

 Oga
 5th Dimension
 Brother X3
 Brother X3 Presto
 Crazy Family
 Mamai
 Oxer
 Stories After Dark Don't Turn Off the Light Korea (New)
 Taiko and Little Peach
 X-VENTURE: Titanoboa
 X-VENTURE: Ancaman Boa Purba
 X-VENTURE: Titanoboa Coils of Doom X-VENTURE Extreme Xploration: Perilous Peak X-VENTURE Extreme Xploration: Kembara Puncak Maut X-VENTURE Extreme Xploration: Drifting Dead X-VENTURE Extreme Xploration: Kebangkitan Mayat Hidup X-VENTURE Extreme Xploration: Skyfallen Safari X-VENTURE Extreme Xploration: Kerajaan Langit X-VENTURE Extreme Xploration: Ferogious Fauna X-VENTURE Extreme Xploration: Jerat Berbisa Flora X-VENTURE Extreme Xploration: Meteoroid Mayhem X-VENTURE Extreme Xploration: Zombie Meteorit X-VENTURE Extreme Xploration: Mammoth Monstrosity X-VENTURE Extreme Xploration: Ledakan Epidemik X-VENTURE Extreme Xploration: Robot Rebellion X-VENTURE Extreme Xploration: Kebangkitan Robotik X-VENTURE Extreme Xploration: Robot Retaliation X-VENTURE Extreme Xploration: Tentangan Robot X-VENTURE Extreme Xploration: Nuclear Nemesis X-VENTURE Extreme Xploration: Angkara Misil X-VENTURE Extreme Xploration: Graveyard Gorge X-VENTURE Extreme Xploration: Azure Abyss Jo Showtime! Donkey High School Chicky & Chucky Mercury Bob Faces Xanseviera Lawak Fairy Godbrother Snap! Next Station Love Boat Love Track Love Band Love Terminal Neko Online.com Michael Chuah / C2V 3 Hour to Master: How To Build Memory and Focus 3 Hour to Master: How To Control Your Finances 3 Hour to Master: How To Expand Your Creativity 3 Hour to Master: How To Get Perfect Marks 3 Hour to Master: How To Manage Your Mood 3 Hour to Master: How To Maintain Good Friendships 3 Hour to Master: How To Reduce Stress 3 Hour to Master: How To Strengthen Self-Discipline 3 Hour to Master: How To Stay Healthy 3 Hour to Master: How To Surf Safely Gengkey Gengkey (Remake) Lawak OK-KO X-VENTURE: Kappa X-VENTURE: Misi Menyelamat Kappa X-VENTURE: Kappa Chaos Monster Chaos Kenny Chua Jinggo Concluded Jinggo Replay Pop! Bang! Boom! Other Glock 17 oleh Ageha
 Mat Gempak (Remake) oleh Apoh
 Mat Gempak oleh Apoh and Botak
 Kishiro Budak Sihir oleh Bear
 Shadow Quest oleh Clay
 Falcon oleh Clay
 Jangka Attribut oleh Clay
 Jejak Neraka oleh Cicak
 Zaman Gemilang oleh Hang Sembilan
 5 Elemen oleh Kash
 Dunia Cahaya oleh Kash
 Gol Kraziee 2000 oleh Kash
 Red Fox oleh King Kong
 Dewi Remaja (Manhwa) oleh Lee Ju
 IT Ekspress oleh Neko (komik pengiklanan)
 Go Notty oleh Nizam Bachok
 Velocity oleh Puppeteer
 Evolusi Identiti oleh Puppeteer
 Jinggo (Remake) oleh Puppeteer
 Twisted Mind of Puyuh oleh Puyuh@Leong Wan Kok
 Student King oleh Stanley G
 Hotlink Warrior oleh Slaium (komik pengiklanan)
 Jackie Perang Pit oleh Taufan
 Fear Factor oleh Taufan
 Pahlawan Raja Alam oleh Taufan
 Experiment 105 oleh Totoro
 Detektif Hantu oleh Totoro
 Detektif Hantu (Remake) oleh Totoro
 G.R.A.V.E. oleh Totoro
 Journey to the West/Raja Monyet oleh Totoro
 Pelayan Rahasia Segi TiGA Rahsia Siri Maskaret Cinta oleh kartunis berbeza (bahagian kekal)
 Dari Alam Angker/Komik Angker oleh kartunis berbeza (bahagian kekal)
 Komik Eksklusif oleh kartunis berbeza (bahagian kekal)
 X-Pax Channel Comic oleh kartunis berbeza (komik pengiklanan)
 Komik Antarabangsa oleh artis antarabangsa (Usang)
 Zoology oleh Stanley G, Neko, Jo, and Keith
 Taufan Pesaka, bahagian 1, 2, dan  3'' oleh Hang Sembilan (parts 1, 2) and Kash (part 3)

See also
 List of magazines in Malaysia

References

External links
Official website

1998 establishments in Malaysia
Comics magazines
Manga magazines published in Malaysia
Magazines established in 1998
Malay-language magazines
Kadokawa Corporation subsidiaries